Abdul Raheem Kitchell (born 1916) is a Hong Kong international lawn bowler.

Bowls career
Kitchell was born in 1916 in Hong Kong after his family emigrated from Malaysia in the 1890s. He competed in the first World Bowls Championship in Kyeemagh, New South Wales, Australia in 1966. Six years later he won a bronze medal in the 1972 World Outdoor Bowls Championship.

In between he won a gold medal at the 1970 Commonwealth Games in Edinburgh.

Personal life
Kitchell was an oil company executive by trade.

References

1916 births
Possibly living people
Commonwealth Games medallists in lawn bowls
Hong Kong sportsmen
Hong Kong people of Malaysian descent
Bowls players at the 1970 British Commonwealth Games
Commonwealth Games gold medallists for Hong Kong
Hong Kong male bowls players
Medallists at the 1970 British Commonwealth Games